The women's  heptathlon at the 2019 World Athletics Championships was held at the Khalifa International Stadium in Doha, Qatar, from 2 to 4 October 2019.

Records
Before the competition records were as follows:

Schedule
The event schedule, in local time (UTC+3), is as follows:

Results

100 metres hurdles
The 100 metres hurdles event was started on 2 October at 17:05.

High jump
The high jump event was started on 2 October at 18:15.

Shot put
The shot put event was started on 2 October at 20:30.

200 metres
The 200 metres event was started on 2 October at 20:30.

Long jump
The long jump event was started on 3 October at 18:15.

Javelin throw
The javelin throw event was started on 3 October at 18:15.

800 metres
The 800 metres event was started on 4 October at 00:05.

Final standings
The final standings were as follows:

References

Women's heptathlon
Heptathlon at the World Athletics Championships